Recorded Live at the Monterey Jazz Festival is a live album by saxophonist John Handy, recorded in 1965 and released in 1966. It is Handy's most famous album and his debut on Columbia. The original album only features two long instrumental pieces, notable for their "free form", a peculiar use of harmonies and unusual instruments (violin and guitar along with more "classic" jazz instruments are uncommon in jazz music). The bonus track "Tears of Ole Miss (Anatomy of a Riot)", which was added to the now out-of-print 1996 CD edition, was originally featured on New View!.

The album is mentioned in 1995 Charles Burnett's short film When It Rains. Influential critic Ralph J. Gleason called the lineup on the album "an exciting group and one of that will make jazz history." Notwithstanding the praises and its relevance, Recorded Live at the Monterey Jazz Festival still remains a little-known album.

This album is also #67 in a list titled "The 100 Jazz Albums That Shook the World", published by Jazzwise magazine.

It was accorded Five Stars in the Encyclopedia of Popular Music.

Track listing
All compositions by John Handy.

"If Only We Knew" - 27:29
"Spanish Lady" - 19:31
"Tears of Ole Miss (Anatomy of a Riot)" - 23:37 Bonus track on CD reissue, recorded on June 28, 1967 at Village Gate, New York City

Personnel
John Handy – alto saxophone
Mike White – violin
Jerry Hahn – guitar
Don Thompson – bass
Terry Clarke – drums

On bonus track
John Handy – alto saxophone
Bobby Hutcherson - vibraphone
Pat Martino - guitar
Albert Stinson - bass
Doug Sides - drums

References 

1966 live albums
John Handy live albums
Columbia Records live albums
Albums produced by John Hammond (producer)
Albums recorded at the Monterey Jazz Festival